Clayton Daniel Fejedelem (born June 2, 1993) is an American football safety and special teamer for the Miami Dolphins of the National Football League (NFL). He played college football at Saint Xavier and Illinois, and was drafted by the Cincinnati Bengals in the seventh round of the 2016 NFL Draft.

Early years
A native of Illinois, Clayton Fejedelem attended Lemont High School in Lemont, Illinois where he lettered in football, wrestling, and lacrosse. Fejedelem was a two-time All-Conference selection in football for the Lemont Indians, and earned All-State honors in football as a senior in 2010. That same year, he also earned South Suburban Blue Player of the Year honors.

College career

Saint Xavier University 
Fejedelem played two seasons at NAIA Saint Xavier University from 2011 to 2012. In 2011, he recorded 68 tackles, 5.0 TFLs, five interceptions, a team-high nine PBUs, three forced fumbles, four fumble recoveries and one pick-six touchdown. Clayton was named St. Xavier Newcomer of the Year in 2011 after helping the Cougars to the NAIA Championship and 14–1 record. He led SXU to an 11–2 record in 2012, racking up 87 tackles, 10.5 TFLs,1.0 sack, 3 interceptions, 8 PBUs and two fumble recoveries to earn second-team All-Mid-State Football Association honors.

University of Illinois, Urbana-Champaign 
Fejedelem redshirted his junior season at Illinois in 2013 after joining the team as a walk-on during spring practices, but had to sit out due to NCAA transfer rules. In 2014, he recorded his first tackle as an Illini against Western Kentucky and went on to tally 51 tackles, a tackle for loss, two PBUs and a fumble recovery on the season. He played in all 13 games, including one start at Northwestern University where he recorded a career-high of 12 tackles and one PBU. In 2015, Clayton started all 12 games at free safety, going on to record a team-best 140 tackles (fifth in the nation at 11.7 tackles per game), 4.5 TFLs, second PBUs, two INTs, and one FF. He was the Illini Team Captain and Defensive Player of the Year, earning him the All-Big Ten honorable mention selection by coaches and All-Big Ten second-team selections by the media.

Professional career

Cincinnati Bengals
Fejedelem was drafted by the Cincinnati Bengals in the seventh round, 245th overall, in the 2016 NFL Draft. In his rookie season, he appeared in all 16 games and recorded three total tackles. In the 2017 season, he appeared in all 16 games as a team captain and started five. He recorded one interception, two passes defensed, and 56 total tackles. In the 2018, he was named a team captain, played in all 16 games and started one.. During the season opener against the Indianapolis Colts, he recorded a game-clinching 83-yard fumble return for a touchdown on a drive where the Colts were threatening to score and go ahead late. In 2019, he was named a team captain and played in all 16 games.

Miami Dolphins
On March 20, 2020, Fejedelem signed a three-year contract with the Miami Dolphins. In the 2020 season, he was named special teams captain and appeared in 13 games after missing the first three due to injury.  He recorded one FF and 10 tackles total. At Las Vegas, he rushed for 22 yards on a fake punt to convert a 4th-and-1 to extend a drive that ended in a Miami TD.

On September 1, 2022, Fejedelem was placed on injured reserve. He was activated on October 8.

Personal life 
The son of Steven and Colleen Fejedelem, Clayton has two brothers, Ryan (older) and Jeremy (younger). They were born and raised in Lemont, Illinois, a southwestern suburb of Chicago. Fejedelem attended Saint Xavier University as a business major in 2011, but transferred to the University of Illinois Urbana-Champaign in 2013 where he walked on and graduated with a bachelor's degree in communications in 2015. He married Gabriele Fejedelem in Chicago, Illinois in March 2020. The couple welcomed their son in December 2020, and a daughter in July 2022.

References

External links 
 Illinois Fighting Illini bio
 Saint Xavier Cougars bio
 Miami Dolphins bio

1993 births
Living people
American football safeties
Cincinnati Bengals players
Illinois Fighting Illini football players
Miami Dolphins players
People from Lemont, Illinois
Players of American football from Illinois
Saint Xavier University alumni
Sportspeople from Cook County, Illinois
Sportspeople from DuPage County, Illinois